Alnoor Bhimani is Professor of Management Accounting and Director of the South Asia Centre at the London School of Economics and Political Science (LSE). He is former Head of the Department of Accounting and the Founding Director of LSE Entrepreneurship. Bhimani's academic work covers financial management and digitalisation; managerial accounting and strategic finance; entrepreneurship and economic growth; and global development and governance issues.

Biography
Bhimani holds a BSc degree in food science and management from King's College London, an MBA from Cornell University where he was a Fulbright Scholar and obtained his PhD from LSE.   He is also a Chartered Professional Accountant (Canada).  Bhimani took up a  lectureship in accounting and finance at LSE in 1988 becoming professor from 2006.   He headed the Department of Accounting at LSE during 2009-2012 and was Director of LSE Entrepreneurship from January 2014 until June 2015. He was a Director of LSE Enterprise from February 2016 to September 2018. 

Bhimani has been a visiting professor at various universities in Europe, North America and Africa.  He has taught as a visiting academic at Aalto University, Bocconi University, London Business School, ISCTE, University of Witwatersrand, University of Western Ontario, and York University (Canada). He has taught courses in Cost Management; Strategy and Control; Internet Entrepreneurship; E-Business and Financial Management; Corporate Governance and Accountability; Developmental organizational Leadership.

His current and past contributions to academia include serving as an advisory board member at several business schools including Wits Business School,  University of International Business and Economics, Strathmore University Business School; University of São Paulo;  Aalto University School of Business; ISCTE Business School and as Honorary Dean at LUMS.

Aalto University School of Business, Helsinki Finland, awarded Professor Bhimani an honorary doctorate in 2016 citing his impact on the research agenda and the orientation of Management Accounting across Europe.

Research and Intellectual Interests
Bhimani's research led to the development of comparative management accounting as an independent research discipline.   He has conducted historical investigations on the emergence of accounting mechanisms indicative of the dependencies between structural accounting controls and cultural shifts over time.  His research on accounting determinants of default investigates the role of non-financial information in averting financial crises.  He has also investigated issues relating to accounting and digitization, artificial intelligence, blockchain, big data and analytics.

His books discuss management accounting research, with reference to practical organizational innovations such as activity-based management, target costing, strategic management accounting and budgetary control systems. His co-authored book with Michael Bromwich, entitled Management Accounting: Evolution not Revolution (1989), discusses strategic investment appraisal

Bhimani’s co-authored book with Bromwich, Management Accounting: Pathways to Progress (1994), talks about problems of maintaining a short-term and internally focused orientation to management accounting information in facing strong global competition. It has received positive reviews, and considered as ‘rich’ and ‘diverse’ by The Accounting Review. His book Management Accounting: Retrospect and Prospect (2009)  considers novel technological challenges faced by managerial accounting.

Bhimani's book Financial Management for Technology Start-ups (2022), discusses the financial and accounting know-how specific to running technology start-ups. His book titled Accounting Disrupted: How Digitalization is Changing Finance  considers how digital technologies such as AI, robotic process automation, the Internet of Things, blockchains and business analytics systems are changing accounting work and the finance function.  Srikant Datar, the Dean of Harvard Business School has said about the book: “Finance professionals need to rethink how to benefit businesses that are digitally transforming.  Rich with insights and examples, this book provides a very valuable roadmap for achieving this goal.”

Publications
 Bhimani, A.,Financial Management for Technology Start-ups, 2022 (Kogan Page)
 Bhimani, A., "Exploring big data's strategic consequences", Journal of Information Technology, (2015) http://www.palgrave-journals.com/jit/journal/vaop/ncurrent/full/jit201429a.html
 Bhimani, A.,Strategic Finance: Achieving High Corporate Performance, 2015 (Strategy Press)

 
 
 Bhimani, A., "Management Accounting Research: past forays and emerging frontiers" in 
 Bhimani, A. (ed.), Contemporary Issues in Management Accounting, 2006 (Oxford: Oxford University Press)
 Bhimani, A. (ed.), Management Accounting in the Digital Economy, 2003 (Oxford: Oxford University Press)
 
 
 
 Bhimani, A. (ed.), Management Accounting: European Perspectives, 1996 (Oxford: Oxford University Press)
 
 
 Bhimani, A., Bromwich, M., Management Accounting: Pathways to Progress, 1994 (London: CIMA)

References

Year of birth missing (living people)
Living people
British Ismailis
Alumni of King's College London
Samuel Curtis Johnson Graduate School of Management alumni
Alumni of the London School of Economics
Academics of the London School of Economics
Accountants